Todwick is a village in the Metropolitan Borough of Rotherham in South Yorkshire, England.  It has a population of 1,637, reducing marginally to 1,634 at the 2011 Census,  and contains a primary school (junior and infants) and a nursery, Todwick Early Years. Todwick also is home to a pub, The Red Lion, and a church. There is a village hall adjacent to the primary school, and this is on the corner of Kiveton Lane and The Pastures. The Pastures has the only shops in the village on it; the Post Office, Doorstop Deli and the Cyprus Gardens pizza house.

The main street in Todwick is Kiveton Lane, which runs through the heart of the village, connecting it at one end to the A57, towards Dinnington, Anston, Thurcroft etc., and at the other end to Station Road in Kiveton Park. At the Kiveton Park end of Kiveton Lane there is a small marker, which was reputed to be the site of a look out post for Robin Hood. A plaque marks the spot behind a white gate just outside the village. Todwick can only be accessed by road or footpath; the nearest railway stations are Kiveton Bridge and Kiveton Park on the Sheffield to Lincoln line. Its location near to the M1 motorway gives the village's inhabitants good access to the country. Local towns provide many job opportunities for Todwick's working population.

Todwick has two parks; the smallest is alongside the church graveyard on Lindleys Croft, and has had in previous years, swings, a roundabout, climbing frame and a basketball court. The other park is known as "the rec" to locals. It has two football fields on it, as well as slides and roundabouts at the village end, and a bowling green and cricket field at the far end. The village's annual bonfire on Guy Fawkes Night is held here, where many locals gather for hot dogs, toffee apples, sparklers and fireworks, although this has not been organised for the past few years due to health and safety hazards. Todwick Junior and Infant School was rated as satisfactory in an Ofsted report during 2010. Todwick also has a football club placed on the "rec" which is named Kiveton park FC, previously the Todwick Trojans.

In the 1960s, plans were made for an airport at Todwick to serve Sheffield and Rotherham. However, the plans were not realised, and Sheffield did not get its own airport until the 1990s, which itself closed fully in 2008.

See also
Listed buildings in Todwick

References

External links

Villages in South Yorkshire
Geography of the Metropolitan Borough of Rotherham
Civil parishes in South Yorkshire